Fortune ( – 1798) was an African-American slave who achieved posthumous notability over the transfer of his remains from a museum storage room to a state funeral.

Life 
Under the laws of the 18th century American colonial period, Fortune, his wife Dinah, and their four children (Africa, Jacob, Mira, and Roxa) were the property of Dr. Preserved Porter, a physician based in Waterbury, Connecticut.  Fortune owned the house he and his family lived in that was just outside of the town center on the Porter property.

Fortune's Remains 
Fortune drowned in an accident in the Naugatuck River in 1798, and Dr. Porter dissected his body and preserved his skeleton for anatomic study. The doctor then opened a "School for Anatomy," which used Fortune's bone as the source of study. The anatomically inscribed skeleton was found in 1910 in a boarded up closet of the Porter house.

The Porter family held Fortune's remains before donating them to the Mattatuck Museum in Waterbury, where they were on display through the 1970s, after which point they were put in storage.

In 1999, the museum received national attention when media coverage highlighted the discovery of Fortune's remains. Although the skeleton was initially dubbed "Larry," as that name was written on its skull, a later investigation by the African-American Historic Project Committee determined the skeleton belonged to Fortune.

Exhibit 
The museum then created a special exhibit in honor of Fortune that detailed the lives of African-American slaves in the early part of the 19th century.—Fortune's Story: Larry's Legacy. Additionally, a poem by poet Laureate Marilyn Nelson, The Manumission Requiem, is displayed to honor Fortune's. Fortune's bones were not displayed in the exhibit out of respect for his life, but they were studied by scientists in an attempt to understand his life.

State Burial 
On September 12, 2013, Fortune's remains were transferred to the Connecticut State Capitol, where they laid in state before being escorted by state police to St. John's Episcopal Church on the Green, the Waterbury parish where Fortune was baptized in 1797, and a funeral at the city's Riverside Cemetery.

References

1743 births
1798 deaths
People from Waterbury, Connecticut
18th-century American slaves
Accidental deaths in Connecticut
Burials at Riverside Cemetery (Waterbury, Connecticut)
Deaths by drowning in the United States
People of colonial Connecticut